Jared Bernstein (born 1955) is an American economist. He is a senior fellow at the Center on Budget and Policy Priorities. From 2009 to 2011, Bernstein was the chief economist and economic adviser to Vice President Joe Biden in the Obama Administration. In 2008, Michael D. Shear described Bernstein as a progressive and "a strong advocate for workers". Bernstein is currently a Member of the Council of Economic Advisers in the Biden administration.

In February 2023, President Joe Biden nominated Bernstein to serve as Chair of the Council of Economic Advisers.

Early life and education 
Bernstein graduated with a bachelor's degree in music from the Manhattan School of Music where he studied double bass with Orin O'Brien. He also earned a Master of Social Work from Hunter College as well as a master's degree in philosophy and a PhD in social welfare from Columbia University. He is of Jewish descent.

Career

Bernstein has taught at Howard University, Columbia University, and New York University. His areas of interest include "federal, state and international economic policies, specifically the middle class squeeze, income inequality and mobility, trends in employment and earnings, low-wage labor markets, poverty, and international comparisons." He is known as a critic of free trade agreements such as the North American Free Trade Agreement (NAFTA).

In 1992, Bernstein started working as a senior official at the Economic Policy Institute (EPI), a liberal think tank with a focus on issues affecting low- and middle-income working people. From 1995 to 1996, he served in the United States Department of Labor as deputy chief economist. He then returned to the EPI, as senior economist and director of the Living Standards Program, until he was selected by Biden. His designated job on the vice presidential staff is a new position, created because of "the critical nature of the economic challenges facing America." Upon his appointment, some journalists claimed that it "contrasts sharply with the more centrist views of many of president-elect Barack Obama's economic advisers."

Bernstein sits on the Congressional Budget Office's advisory committee. He is a contributor at the financial news network CNBC. He also was appointed executive director of the Middle Class Working Families Task Force and is responsible for direct management of the project.

Paul Krugman, a Nobel laureate in economics and a noted progressive columnist, argued in November 2008 that the centrist makeup of President Barack Obama's economic inner circle, the new Economic Recovery Advisory Board, could be used to "give progressive economists a voice," and he mentioned Bernstein and fellow EPI economist president Lawrence Mishel among others as progressive economists who might be suitable for the board.

Biden administration
On September 5, 2020, Bernstein was announced to be a member of the advisory council of the Biden-Harris Transition Team, which was planning the presidential transition of Joe Biden. Subsequently, President Joe Biden selected Bernstein to serve on the Council of Economic Advisors in January 2021.

In February 2023, Bernstein was nominated as Chair of the Council of Economic Advisers by President Biden, replacing Cecilia Rouse.

Dialogue with heterodoxy
In 2018, Bernstein opened a public dialogue with the proponents of the heterodox branch of economics of Modern Monetary Theory, in which Bill Mitchell, a proponent of MMT, was the first to engage.

Publications
Bernstein's books include All Together Now: Common Sense for a Fair Economy and Crunch: Why Do I Feel So Squeezed? (And Other Unsolved Economic Mysteries). He coauthored the last nine editions of The State of Working America, an ongoing analysis published since 1988 by the Economic Policy Institute, as well as coauthoring The Benefits of Full Employment: When Markets Work for People, where he states that "[l]ow unemployment by itself cannot address
all the inequities in society," and advocates that "[o]ther forms of intervention are still
needed to assist disadvantaged populations."

He is a regular columnist for The American Prospect online, a contributor to the CNBC financial news television network, and an op-ed writer in the New York Times and the Washington Post. He has also written Diary entries on the Daily Kos website.

References

External links

20th-century American Jews
Economists from New York (state)
American economics writers
American male non-fiction writers
American columnists
Columbia University School of Social Work alumni
Silberman School of Social Work at Hunter College alumni
Manhattan School of Music alumni
Obama administration personnel
Writers from New York City
1955 births
Living people
21st-century American economists
Biden administration personnel
United States Council of Economic Advisers
20th-century American economists
Center on Budget and Policy Priorities
21st-century American Jews
Jewish American economists